Group field theory (GFT) is a quantum field theory in which the base manifold is taken to be a Lie group. It is closely related to background independent quantum gravity approaches such as loop quantum gravity, the spin foam formalism and causal dynamical triangulation. It can be shown that its perturbative expansion can be interpreted as spin foams and simplicial pseudo-manifolds (depending on the representation of the fields). Thus, its partition function defines a non-perturbative sum over all simplicial topologies and geometries, giving a path integral formulation of quantum spacetime.

See also 
Shape dynamics
Causal Sets
Fractal cosmology
Loop quantum gravity
Planck scale
Quantum gravity
Regge calculus
Simplex
Simplicial manifold
Spin foam

References
 Wayback Machine see Sec 6.8  Dynamics: III. Group field theory
 
 
 
 
 
 
 
 
 

Quantum gravity